Juliane may refer to:

Emilie Juliane of Schwarzburg-Rudolstadt (1637–1706), German countess and hymn writer
Juliane Aisner (1919–1980), World War II French Resistance Agent
Juliane Banse (born 1969), German soprano and lieder singer
Juliane Köhler (born 1965), German theatre, television, and film actress
Juliane Koepcke (born 1954), sole survivor of the 1971 crash of LANSA Flight 508 in the Peruvian rainforest
Juliane Kokott (born 1957), the German Advocate General at the Court of Justice of the European Communities
Juliane Leopold (born 1983), German journalist 
Juliane Rasmussen (born 1979), Danish rower
Juliane Rautenberg (born 1966), former German television actress
Juliane Schenk (born 1982), female badminton player from Germany
Juliane Sprenger-Afflerbach (born 1977), retired German hurdler
Juliane Werding (born 1956), German singer 
Marianne and Juliane, 1981 film directed by Margarethe von Trotta
Princess Juliane of Saxe-Coburg-Saalfeld (1781–1860), German princess of the ducal house of Saxe-Coburg-Saalfeld

German feminine given names